The women's pentathlon  at the 1992 European Athletics Indoor Championships was held in Palasport di Genova on 1 March. This was the first time that this event was held at the European Athletics Indoor Championships.

Results

References

Combined events at the European Athletics Indoor Championships
Pentathlon
1992 in women's athletics